Elsbach may refer to:

 Peter Elsbach (born 1924), Dutch physician
 Els (Streu), also called Elsbach, a river of Bavaria, Germany, tributary of the Streu
 Elsbach, a river in central Germany, tributary of the Zorge (river)